A lieutenant is a police rank in some police departments, such as the Police of France, the Netherlands Royal Marechaussee, the Philippine National Police, the Police of Russia, the National Police of Ukraine, the Estonian Police and Border Guard Board, the Police of Armenia, the Militia of the Republic of Belarus, the Federal Police of Germany, the Vietnam People's Public Security, the Spain Civil Guard, the Royal Thai Police, the Buenos Aires Provincial Police, the Mossos d'Esquadra, the Sûreté du Québec, and various law enforcement in the United States.

By country

France 

France uses the rank of lieutenant for management duties in both uniformed and plain-clothed policing. The rank comes senior to lieutenant intern and junior to capitaine.

This rank was previously known as inspecteur for plain-clothed officers, and officier de la paix for officers in uniform.

United Kingdom 
In the United Kingdom, the approximate equivalent rank of a police lieutenant is that of inspector.

United States 

In most U.S. police departments, the rank of lieutenant is immediately above that of sergeant. A police lieutenant is often the deputy officer in charge of a precinct.

In some smaller police departments, a person holding the rank of police lieutenant may be in charge of a division (patrol division, detective division, etc.) within that department. In larger police departments, a police lieutenant may command only one section of a precinct which is commanded by either a police captain, police major, police inspector, or the next highest rank. A police lieutenant is considered senior management in most large urban police departments. Unlike a lieutenant in the military, who is typically a recent inductee, police lieutenants typically have many years of experience in their field prior to attaining the rank.

New York
In the New York City Police Department, the rank of lieutenant is immediately below police captain. Lieutenants are usually veterans with extensive experience.

Boston
In the Boston Police Department, there are ranks of lieutenant and lieutenant detective.

See also
Lieutenant

References

External links
 Police lieutenant
 Examples of work

Police ranks